Dasia nicobarensis, the Nicobar tree skink or Nicobar dasia, is a species of arboreal skink found in the Nicobar Islands of India.

Distribution
Types: ZSI 23211 (holotype), "Coconut grove, about 2 km S.W. of Teetop Guest House, Car Nicobar" (09°10′N; 92°47′E, in the Nicobar Islands, Bay of Bengal, India); ZSI 23212 (paratype), "Circuit House, Malacea (= Malacca), Car Nicobar" (in the Nicobar Islands, Bay of Bengal, India).

Dasia nicobarensis is known from the Nicobar Islands. Its presence in the Andaman Islands is uncertain.

Description

References

 Das, I. 1999 Biogeography of the amphibians and reptiles of the Andaman and Nicobar Islands, India. In: Ota, H. (ed) Tropical Island herpetofauna.., Elsevier, pp. 43–77

nicobarensis
Endemic fauna of the Nicobar Islands
Reptiles of India
Reptiles described in 1977
Taxa named by Sayantan Biswas
Taxa named by Pranbes Sanyal